Isabel María Ortuño Torrico (born 16 March 1982) is a former Spanish handballer, who have been capped for the Spanish national team.

Ortuño was born in Elda, Spain, and competed in the 2004 Olympic Games in Athens, where she finished sixth with the Spanish women's handball team, after losing 29–38 to Hungary in the placement match.

Awards and recognition
 EHF Cup Winners' Cup Top Scorer: 2011

References

External links
 Profile on the European Handball Federation official website

1982 births
Living people
People from Elda
Sportspeople from the Province of Alicante
Spanish female handball players
Olympic handball players of Spain
Handball players at the 2004 Summer Olympics
Competitors at the 2005 Mediterranean Games
Mediterranean Games gold medalists for Spain
Expatriate handball players
Spanish expatriate sportspeople in Denmark
Mediterranean Games medalists in handball